The Tuspark Shanghai (Chinese: 清华科技园（上海）) or Shanghai Multimedia Valley (SMV), Tsinghua University Science Park is a Chinese high-tech company which builds business parks. It is located in Zhabei District of Shanghai, among Gonghe New Road, Pengyuepu River, Guangzhong West Road and Lingshi Road. The SMV was established in the August 2002.

See also
 Silicon Valley
 Light Valley
 Pharmaceutics Valley
 Nanometer Valley

References

External links
 - Shanghai Multimedia Valley's official website (English)
 - official website (Chinese)
 - webpage about Shanghai Multimedia Valley (English)

Information technology places